La sala de los magos is a sculpture by Alejandro Colunga, installed in 1993 outside Hospicio Cabañas in Guadalajara, in the Mexican state of Jalisco. Seven years later, Los magos universales, also by Colunga, complemented the artwork.

References

External links

 

1993 establishments in Mexico
1993 sculptures
Outdoor sculptures in Guadalajara
Surrealism
Works by Mexican people